Stuart Ernest Piggott,  (28 May 1910 – 23 September 1996) was a British archaeologist, best known for his work on prehistoric Wessex.

Early life
Piggott was born in Petersfield, Hampshire, the son of G. H. O. Piggott, and was educated there at Churcher's College.

Career
On leaving school in 1927 Piggott took up a post as assistant at Reading Museum, where he developed an expertise in Neolithic pottery.

In 1928 he joined the Royal Commission on the Ancient and Historical Monuments of Wales and spent the next five years producing a revolutionary study of the site of Butser Hill, near Petersfield. He also worked with Eliot Cecil Curwen on their excavations at The Trundle causewayed enclosure in Sussex.

In the 1930s he began working for Alexander Keiller, an amateur archaeologist who funded his work from the profits of his Dundee Marmalade business. The two dug numerous sites in Wessex including Avebury and Kennet Avenue. In 1933, he joined his friend Grahame Clark in writing the highly significant paper, "The age of the British flint mines" (Antiquity, 1933): the resultant controversy led to the foundation of the Prehistoric Society. Still without any formal archaeological qualification, Piggott enrolled at Mortimer Wheeler's Institute of Archaeology, London, taking his diploma in 1936. It was also here that he met his wife, Peggy (Margaret Guido). In 1937 he published another seminal paper, "The early Bronze Age in Wessex", and with his wife went on in June 1939 to join the burial chamber excavations at Sutton Hoo at the invitation of Charles Phillips.

During the Second World War Piggott worked as an air photo interpreter. He was posted to India, where he spent time studying the archaeology of the sub-continent, eventually leading him to write the books Some Ancient Cities of India (1946) and Prehistoric India (1950). These experiences provided him with a valuable external view of European prehistory, which was to prove useful on his return to Britain.

After the war he went to Oxford to study the work of William Stukeley, but in 1946 was offered the Abercromby Chair of Archaeology at Edinburgh University (now part of the School of History, Classics and Archaeology), in succession to Gordon Childe. Piggott succeeded in making Edinburgh an archaeology department of international standing. He continued to publish widely. His book Neolithic Cultures of the British Isles (1954) was highly influential, until radiocarbon dating tests exposed flaws in its chronology. Piggott considered that radiocarbon dating was "archaeologically unacceptable", because every other shred of evidence pointed towards his dates being correct. Ancient Europe (1965) remained a popular survey of Old World prehistory for more than twenty years, demonstrating his view of the solidarity and continuity of the past in Europe. In 1956 his childless marriage ended.

In 1958 Piggott published a survey of Scottish prehistory, Scotland before History, and in 1959 a popular introductory volume, Approach to Archaeology. He was president of the Prehistoric Society from 1960 to 1963, president of the Society of Antiquaries of Scotland from 1963 to 1967, president of the Council for British Archaeology from 1967 to 1970, and a trustee of the British Museum between 1968 and 1974). In 1963, he produced a thorough analysis of the Beaker culture in Britain, published as part of a Festschrift dedicated to Cyril Fox. Piggott's interest in the early history of the practice of archaeology led to him writing The Druids in 1968; other books included Prehistoric Societies (with Grahame Clark), The Earliest Wheeled Transport (1983), followed by its sequel, Wagon, Chariot and Carriage (1992). His final book was Ancient Britain and the Antiquarian Imagination (1989).

He died of a heart attack at his home near Wantage in Oxfordshire on 23 September 1996. His remains were cremated on 30 September at Oxford crematorium.

Family

On 12 November 1936, he married Celia Margaret Preston, an archaeologist and finds specialist; they had met while students at the Institute of Archaeology in London. By 1954, their relationship was over, and they divorced in 1956. She became better known under her second married name, Margaret Guido.

Excavations
Sites he excavated (often with Richard Atkinson) included Cairnpapple Hill in West Lothian; Wayland's Smithy in Oxfordshire; and West Kennet Long Barrow and Stonehenge in Wiltshire.

Honours
In 1957 he was elected a Fellow of the Royal Society of Edinburgh. His proposers were Robert Schlapp, David Whitteridge, Sidney Newman, and James Ritchie.

He received the CBE in 1972, and was awarded numerous academic awards from scholarly institutions in Britain and abroad. He retired from the Abercromby Chair in 1977 and was awarded the gold medal of the Society of Antiquaries of London in 1983 and the Grahame Clark Medal of the British Academy in 1992.

Reception and legacy
Vincent Megaw commented that "as [Piggott] himself has said, although he has done his fair share of field work and excavation, his prime concern has been to produce works of synthesis and interpretation". Megaw added that Piggott viewed "archaeology as an oyster to be savoured whole and not simply to be subjected to the minutiae of macrofaunal and calorific analyses." The historian Ronald Hutton stated that it was "one aspect of his greatness that he fostered the study of early modern antiquaries as an integral part of the self-awareness of his profession."

In 1968 a number of Piggott's former pupils and colleagues assembled a collection of essays dedicated to him, titled Studies in Ancient Europe. In 1976 Megaw published a second Festschrift, which brought in consideration of Piggott's work on the archaeology of Asia and the Americas.

In the 2021 film The Dig, which told the story of the Sutton Hoo excavations, Piggott was portrayed by Ben Chaplin, although the film takes some creative license with its presentation of his marriage to his wife Peggy.

Publications

Marjorie Robertson compiled a list of Piggott's books up to 1975 for his festschrift.

References

Sources
 
 
 
 
 
  
 

People from Petersfield
British archaeologists
Academics of the University of Edinburgh
People associated with the University of Edinburgh School of History, Classics and Archaeology
Alumni of the UCL Institute of Archaeology
Commanders of the Order of the British Empire
1910 births
1996 deaths
People educated at Churcher's College
People associated with Stonehenge
Fellows of the Society of Antiquaries of London
Recipients of the Grahame Clark Medal
Fellows of the Society of Antiquaries of Scotland
20th-century archaeologists
Fellows of the British Academy
Sutton Hoo